The Kou-Kamma Municipality is a local municipality in South Africa. It is situated in the southwest corner of the Sarah Baartman District Municipality along the Indian Ocean coastline, in the southwestern sector of South Africa's Eastern Cape Province.  To the west lies the Western Cape Province. Kou-Kamma also borders the Dr Beyers Naudé Local Municipality in the north and the Kouga Local Municipality to the east. The geographical area of the Municipality is 12,540 square kilometres.
Its name is a blend of the names of the Kouga (Kou-) and Tsitsikamma (-Kamma) mountains, which in turn were named after the rivers Kouga and Tsitsikamma.

The municipality is a relatively poor area with high unemployment and low levels of literacy.  Settlements tend to be scattered, which has posed challenges to the provision of infrastructure and basic services such as water, sanitation, and electricity.

The Kou-Kamma Municipality is composed of two distinct regions:  the coastal belt (referred to as the Tsitsikamma or the Western Coastal Zone, which includes settlements such as Coldstream, Storms River and Clarkson), and the inland area of the Langkloof (including settlements such as Kareedouw, Twee Riviere, Joubertina and Louterwater). The two areas are separated by the Tsitsikamma Mountains.

The nature of the two areas differs vastly. The Coastal Zone is characterised by a diverse and fast-growing economy driven by tourism and agriculture, a fast-growing population linked to the economic opportunities, a good water supply, and a wealth of holiday destinations and indigenous forests.

In contrast, employment in the Langkloof is characterised by seasonal agriculture with high labour requirements.  The area has greater challenges in terms of sufficient water supply, with additional pressure due to a high population growth related to migrant labour.

Main places
The 2001 census divided the municipality into the following main places:

Politics

The municipal council consists of eleven members elected by mixed-member proportional representation. Six councillors are elected by first-past-the-post voting in six wards, while the remaining five are chosen from party lists so that the total number of party representatives is proportional to the number of votes received. In the election of 1 November 2021 the African National Congress (ANC) won six seats on the council.
The following table shows the results of the election.

References

External links
 Official website

Local municipalities of the Sarah Baartman District Municipality